Clélia Rard-Reuse (born 1 August 1988 in Riddes, Valais) is a Swiss athlete specialising in the sprint hurdles.

She was an unused reserve runner in the 4 × 100 metres relay at the 2012 Summer Olympics.

International competitions

Personal bests
Outdoors
100 metres – 11.58 (+0.2 m/s, Thun 2016)
100 metres hurdles – 12.87 (+1.6 m/s, Thun 2016)
Long jump – 6.60 (+0.5 m/s, Bulle 2011)
Heptathlon – 5305 (Landquart 2010)
Indoors
60 metres hurdles – 8.14 (St. Gallen 2016)
Long jump – 6.44 (Magglingen 2011)

References

External links
Clélia Reuse's profile on All Athletics
Clélia Reuse's profile on European Athletics

Living people
1988 births
Swiss female long jumpers
Swiss female hurdlers
Swiss female sprinters
Olympic athletes of Switzerland
Athletes (track and field) at the 2016 Summer Olympics
Sportspeople from Valais